William Lalnunfela (born 6 July 1995) is an Indian professional footballer who plays as a forward for Rajasthan United in the I-League.

Career

Early career
Born in Kolasib, Mizoram, Lalnunfela started playing football at the age of twelve, starting off as a goalkeeper before switching to a striker. He spent the first two seasons of his footballing career with his local club, Pui Pui, before joining the under-16 side of his village team, Vengthar VC. After playing for the club in a Red-Ribbon inter-village tournament, Lalnunfela was scouted by Pune, an I-League club, and was told to trial with their academy. With the Pune Academy, Lalnunfela finished as the top scorer in the 2013 edition of the I-League U20 while the academy won the tournament for two seasons in a row. After graduating from the academy in 2013, Lalnunfela moved back to his home state and signed with Chanmari. He also played for the Mizoram state side in the Santosh Trophy in 2014 and 2015 and the side that won the gold medal for football at the 2015 National Games of India.

Aizawl
His consistent performances in the domestic league for Chanmari attracted interest from Aizawl FC in 2015.

In 2015, Lalnunfela joined Aizawl and played for the club in the I-League 2nd Division the season they earned promotion to the I-League and the Mizoram Premier League. He made his professional debut for the club in the I-League on 28 February 2016 against Bengaluru FC. He came on as a halftime substitute for Albert Zohmingmawia as Aizawl lost 1–0.The 25-year old gradually grew in stature at Aizawl FC and played a crucial role in their historic I-League quest in the 2016-17 season under the tutelage of Khalid Jamil. Apart from scoring goals, William is known for his blistering pace and ability to play in multiple attacking positions.

Mohun Bagan
His talent stood out and Kolkata giants Mohun Bagan signed him in 2018 and he spent a season in Kolkata.  He featured in 12 matches for the Reds and scored twice and also registered an assist.

Aizawl
After only one season in Kolkata with Mohun Bagan, he came back to Aizawl plied his trade for the Reds in the last I-League season. He played 12 scored 2 times and provided one assist.

Jamshedpur FC
On 13 September 2020 , William Lalnunfela penned down a three year contract with Jamshedpur FC which will see him wearing the club colours till 2023.

NorthEast United FC 
On 11 September 2021, it was announced that Lalnunfela was signed by NorthEast United ahead of the 2021–22 season.

Career statistics

Club

Honours

Club
Aizawl FC
I-League(1): 2016–17
Mohun Bagan
Calcutta Football League (1): 2018–19

References

1995 births
Living people
Indian footballers
Pune FC players
Aizawl FC players
Association football forwards
Footballers from Mizoram
I-League 2nd Division players
Mizoram Premier League players
I-League players
People from Kolasib
Chanmari FC players
Mohun Bagan AC players
Jamshedpur FC players
NorthEast United FC players
Rajasthan United FC players